Anthony Ralph "Tank" Gordon (c. 1948/49 – 25 March 2012) was a New Zealand rugby league and rugby union footballer and coach who represented the New Zealand Kiwis in the 1975 World Cup and coached them to the 1988 World Cup Final. He was known for his strong kick

Early years
Anthony was born in Rotorua. Later he would become a New Zealand Army PT Instructor. While in the army Gordon was the player-coach of the Wairau army and played rugby union for King Country.

Playing career
Gordon then switched to rugby league in 1975 and joined the Maritime club in the Auckland Rugby League. He made the New Zealand national rugby league team after only 14 rugby league matches. He played in thirteen test matches for the Kiwis, including at the 1975 World Cup.

Coaching career
After retirement Gordon turned his attention to coaching. He had a brief spell with Mangere East before he was convinced to become Central's head coach in the Bay of Plenty Rugby League competition. Gordan was met with immediate success, taking control of the Bay of Plenty and Northern Districts sides. In 1987 he became coach of the New Zealand national rugby league team. The Kiwis toured Australia and Papua New Guinea in 1987 and Gordon was involved in an upset win of Australia. The team couldn't repeat the feat in 1988 as they lost the final of the World Cup in front of 47,000 fans at Eden Park. The Kiwis toured Britain and France in 1989 before Gordon was replaced as Kiwis coach.

Gordon became coach of the London Crusaders in 1993 before joining Hull F.C. for the 1994–1995 season.

Halfway through the 1995 Lion Red Cup Neil Joyce resigned as the coach of the Bay of Plenty Stags. Gordon became a co-coach alongside Lawrence Brydon for the remainder of the season. In 1996 he remained with the Stags as the business Manager while Brydon became the head coach. During the season he was suspended and investigated by the New Zealand Rugby League over accusations of fraud. He was later cleared of all charges.

Between 1996 and 2001 he coached the Coastline Mariners.

Later years
In 2006 Gordon was the coach of Kahukura in the Baywide rugby union competition. He died on 25 March 2012 after a long illness.

References

1940s births
2012 deaths
Bay of Plenty rugby league team coaches
Bay of Plenty rugby league team players
Coastline rugby league team coaches
Harlequins Rugby League coaches
Hull F.C. coaches
London Broncos coaches
Mangere East Hawks coaches
Maritime rugby league team players
New Zealand Army personnel
New Zealand national rugby league team coaches
New Zealand national rugby league team players
New Zealand rugby league coaches
New Zealand rugby league players
New Zealand rugby union coaches
New Zealand rugby union players
Rugby league fullbacks
Rugby league players from Rotorua
Rugby league wingers
Rugby union players from Rotorua